Han Lao Da, originally named Ann Jong Juan, is a Singaporean playwright, as well as founder and principal of Han Language Centre. Han received the Cultural Medallion for his contributions in the Singaporean drama scene, and is also recognised for his xiangsheng contributions in Singapore.

Early life and education
Han was born in Singapore with his ancestral roots in Wenchang, Hainan, China.

Arts career 
Han started composing xiangsheng plays since the 1970s, and he started studying the works of renowned xiangsheng artist Ma Ji . Han's debut play was entitled The gift ticket. The play was performed in Singapore and major towns and cities all over peninsula Malaysia. In 1984, Han got to befriend Ma Ji, and in 1986, Han also befriended noted performers like Jiang Kun and Tang Jie Zhong. After making these acquaintances, Han began to absorb all the artistic knowledge he can from these noted xiangsheng performers so that he could bring the art of xiangsheng to Singapore, and promote the local xiangsheng culture. He worked hard with other xiangsheng enthusiasts, and produced many scripts for local performances. His works garnered many local awards and won many xiangsheng competitions. He also published three xiangsheng collections and critiques containing a total of 45 xiangsheng scripts. In 2000, his article introducing Singaporean xiangsheng was published in the column on xiangsheng history, published in the Chinese Xiangsheng Network.

At the same time, Han is a noted playwright active in the Singaporean drama scene. He has written a total of nine full-length drama and many short plays.

Business career 
In 1993, Han founded Han Language Centre.

Awards
 1990: Cultural Medallion (Theatre), by the National Arts Council Singapore
 1994: National Book award, by the Singapore Federation of Chinese Clan Associations
 1995: Broadcast award, by the China Federation of Literary and Art Circles
 2017: Singapore Chinese Cultural Contribution Award by Singapore Chinese Cultural Centre

Published works
 
 
   Singapore National Library (Call Number Chinese 792.2028 TT)

Plays that have been performed but not published

Full-length drama
 The sisters Jin and Yin
 The Door
 The five Libra
 The Soaring heights
 The Teochew Kangaroo
 Yelin School

Short plays
 What time is it?
 Aliens
 The Call
 Face

References

1947 births
Living people
Singaporean people of Chinese descent
Hainanese people
Singaporean theatre directors
Singaporean dramatists and playwrights
Xiangsheng
Recipients of the Cultural Medallion